The men's 200 metres event at the 2014 World Junior Championships in Athletics was held in Eugene, Oregon, USA, at Hayward Field on 24 and 25 July.

Medalists

Records

Results

Final
Wind +2.3

Semifinals
24 July
First 2 in each heat (Q) and the next 2 fastest (q) advance to the Final

Summary

Details
First 2 in each heat (Q) and the next 2 fastest (q) advance to the Final

Semifinal 1
25 July
Start time: 18:38  Temperature: 23 °C  Humidity: 44 %
Wind: +1.9 m/s

Semifinal 2
25 July
Start time: 18:44  Temperature: 23 °C  Humidity: 44 %
Wind: +1.3 m/s

Note:
IAAF Rule 163.3(a) - Lane infringement

Semifinal 3
25 July
Start time: 18:53  Temperature: 23 °C  Humidity: 44 %
Wind: +1.8 m/s

Heats
24 July
First 2 in each heat (Q) and the next 6 fastest (q) advance to the Semi-Finals

Summary

Details
First 2 in each heat (Q) and the next 6 fastest (q) advance to the Semi-Finals

Heat 1
25 July
Start time: 10:44  Temperature: 16 °C  Humidity: 68 %
Wind: -0.8 m/s

Heat 2
25 July
Start time: 10:49  Temperature: 16 °C  Humidity: 68 %
Wind: -0.1 m/s

Heat 3
25 July
Start time: 10:55  Temperature: 16 °C  Humidity: 68 %
Wind: +0.7 m/s

Heat 4
25 July
Start time: 11:02  Temperature: 16 °C  Humidity: 68 %
Wind: -0.3 m/s

Heat 5
25 July
Start time: 11:08  Temperature: 16 °C  Humidity: 68 %
Wind: -0.6 m/s

Note:
IAAF Rule 163.3(a) - Lane infringement

Heat 6
25 July
Start time: 11:13  Temperature: 19 °C  Humidity: 56 %
Wind: -0.2 m/s

Note:
BIB 1087 Ismael Tjiramba - Yellow Card - 162.5(b) Delaying the start

Heat 7
25 July
Start time: 11:21  Temperature: 19 °C  Humidity: 56 %
Wind: +0.6 m/s

Heat 8
25 July
Start time: 11:26  Temperature: 19 °C  Humidity: 56 %
Wind: +0.1 m/s

Heat 9
25 July
Start time: 11:32  Temperature: 20 °C  Humidity: 56 %
Wind: +1.0 m/s

Participation
According to an unofficial count, 66 athletes from 48 countries participated in the event.

References

External links
 WJC14 200 metres schedule

200 metres
200 metres at the World Athletics U20 Championships